Abram Colby was an African-American freedman who served in the Georgia House of Representatives during the Reconstruction era. He was a enslaved from birth, owned by his father. He became a minister.

Early life
Colby was the son of an enslaved woman and a white planter. He resided in Greene County, Georgia and was freed fifteen years prior to emancipation. He was an early organizer of freed slaves. Colby and minister Henry McNeal Turner helped form a chapter of the American Equal Rights Association.

Service
Colby was known for eloquent oratory and represented Greene County in 1865 at a freeman's convention. A Radical Republican, Colby was first elected in 1866. Colby could not read, so he kept his son close to him during all official legislative matters, to act as his secretary. In the election of 1868 under the "Reconstruction Constitution", roughly 1,200 of Greene County's 1,500 eligible black voters turned out to help elect two Republicans to the House. They were Colby and a former Confederate Major, moderate republican Robert McWhorter, who went on to serve as Speaker of the House. In that same election, Ulysses S. Grant carried Greene County in the Presidential race. Unable to defeat Colby at the polls, and failing in their attempts to intimidate black voters, Greene County Democrats and local merchants offered Colby $5,000 to switch to the Democratic party, or $2,500 to simply resign his seat in the Legislature. Colby responded that he would not do it for all the wealth in Greene County. Two nights later, he was attacked and beaten.

Brutally Beaten by the KKK
On October 29, 1869, he was taken from his bed and beaten by the Ku Klux Klan in front of his family. During his whipping he was asked, "Do you think you will ever vote another damned Radical ticket." He replied, "If there was an election tomorrow, I would vote the Radical ticket." After his remark, the men continued to beat him. Governor Bullock offered a reward of $5,000 for the arrest of the attackers. Faced with debilitating injury, he was unable to work and did not seek re-election. In 1872, he was called before a  joint U.S. House and Senate committee investigating reports of Southern violence. His injuries were so extensive Colby was recorded saying in his testimony during the Joint Select Committee Report: "They broke something inside of me, and the doctor has been attending to me for more than a year. Sometimes I cannot get up and down off my bed, and my left hand is not of much use to me."

References

Year of birth missing
Year of death missing
Republican Party members of the Georgia House of Representatives
African-American state legislators in Georgia (U.S. state)
People from Greene County, Georgia
African-American politicians during the Reconstruction Era
Free Negroes
Original 33
Victims of the Ku Klux Klan
Ku Klux Klan in Georgia (U.S. state)